Juan Antonio García de Palacios (1622–1682) was a Roman Catholic prelate who served as Bishop of Santiago de Cuba (1677–1682).

Biography
Juan Antonio García de Palacios was born in 1622 in México. On 13 Sep 1677, he was appointed during the papacy of Pope Innocent XI as Bishop of Santiago de Cuba. On 20 Nov 1678, he was consecrated bishop by Manuel Fernández de Santa Cruz y Sahagún, Bishop of Tlaxcala, with Father Francisco de Aguiar y Seijas y Ulloa assisting. He served as Bishop of Santiago de Cuba until his death on 1 Jun 1682. While bishop, he was the principal co-consecrator of Francisco de Aguiar y Seijas y Ulloa, Bishop of Michoacán (1678).

References

External links and additional sources
 (for Chronology of Bishops)  
 (for Chronology of Bishops) 

17th-century Roman Catholic bishops in Cuba
Bishops appointed by Pope Innocent XI
1622 births
1682 deaths
Roman Catholic bishops of Santiago de Cuba